The Weakest Link (also known as Weakest Link, Le Maillon Faible in the French version) is a video game based on the television game show of the same name, developed by Traveller's Tales and published by Activision under license from BBC Multimedia for the PlayStation, PlayStation 2 and Microsoft Windows platforms (although the PlayStation 2 port was released exclusively in Europe). In the English (UK / US) version, Anne Robinson, the television show's real-life host, features in the game throughout gameplay and recorded footage, beginning with the opening speech, at the beginning of each round, and during each round's voting stage. In the French version, Laurence Boccolini, the host of the show, is featured in the game for both gameplay and recorded footage.

Gameplay

The gameplay consists of choosing specially-created characters, and the game can be played either with a second player or against the CPU. Players can choose the difficulty of questions for each game, as well as whether to play from the beginning or from a particular round with selected CPU characters. Players can also "bend the rules", changing the settings to whatever they would like to play, including questions, the difficulty of CPU players and more.

The money tree is as follows:

The Team
There are 24 people in the game.

Reception

The PlayStation version received "mixed" reviews, while the PC version received "generally unfavorable reviews", according to the review aggregation website Metacritic.

IGN criticized the PC version's gameplay for slow pace and the graphics by stating they were "drab".

References

External links
 

2001 video games
Activision games
Traveller's Tales games
PlayStation (console) games
PlayStation 2 games
Windows games
Video games based on game shows
Video games developed in the United Kingdom
The Weakest Link
Quiz video games
Multiplayer and single-player video games